Estanislao José Antonio Lynch y Roo, was a Argentine naval officer and wealthy Argentine, the brother of the famous landowner of the "Rio de la Plata" captain Patricio Lynch and the grandson of an Irish immigrant, Patrick Lynch. Estanislao was the third son of Justo Pastor Lynch (1755–1830) and Ana Bernardo Roo (d.1836).

His career
During his period as an Officer in the Argentinian Army of the Andes protected his territory and liberated from the Spanish Crown, On 2 January 1817 the Buenos Aires city council appointed Estanislao Lynch as the major of Barracas.

His Legacy
Along with Chilean exiles and the Army of the Andes, he crossed the Andes to help liberate Chile.

Family
Eventually, he retired from the army and expanded the family's businesses to Valparaiso where he settled and married Carmen Solo de Zaldívar y Rivero, a lady from the Chilean high-society, the couple settled in Chile and issued:

 Luis Alfredo Lynch, Naval Officer
 Patricio Lynch, appointed Chilean Ambassador to Spain, previously a Naval officer in the Chilean Navy reaching the rank of admiral.
 Julio Angel Lynch, Naval Officer

References
 Coghlan, Eduardo A., Los Irlandeses en la Argentina: Su Actuación y Descendencia (Buenos Aires, 1987), p. 626.
 Buenos Aires City Council, Archivo General de la Nación, Series IV, Vol. VII, Sections LXXIV to LXXIX, 1816 and 1817 (Buenos Aires, 1930).
 Dictionary of Irish Latin American Biography, by Gonzalo Cané

People from Buenos Aires
People of the Argentine War of Independence
Argentine people of Irish descent
1793 births
1849 deaths